The Black Butte River is located in the Mendocino National Forest of northern California in Glenn and Mendocino counties.

Whitewater rafting and fishing are popular on the river and forest service campgrounds are nearby at Plaskett Lakes.

See also
 List of rivers in California

References

External links
 Rivers.gov. information page with search engine
  California Creekin' page on Black Butte River whitewater rafting.

Rivers of Mendocino County, California
Rivers of Glenn County, California
Tributaries of the Eel River (California)
Wild and Scenic Rivers of the United States
Mendocino National Forest
Rivers of Northern California